The 2003 Nigerian Senate election in Yobe State was held on April 12, 2003, to elect members of the Nigerian Senate to represent Yobe State. Usman Albishir representing Yobe North, Mamman Bello Ali representing Yobe South and Usman Adamu representing Yobe East all won on the platform of the All Nigeria Peoples Party.

Overview

Summary

Results

Yobe North 
The election was won by Usman Albishir of the All Nigeria Peoples Party.

Yobe South 
The election was won by Mamman Bello Ali of the All Nigeria Peoples Party.

Yobe East 
The election was won by Usman Adamu of the All Nigeria Peoples Party.

References 

April 2003 events in Nigeria
Yobe State Senate elections
Yob